Yehoshua Alouf (1900–1980) was an Israeli writer.

Life and career
Alouf was born in Slonim, Belorussia. At the age of 12, he moved to Israel to study at the Herzliah Gymnasium. From 1914 to 1920, he studied in Warsaw and was trained as a gymnast. Later, in 1920, he became a teacher of physical education in Tel Aviv.

In 1925, Alouf attended the Physical Education Institute, Copenhagen.

In the 1930s, he founded the Amateur Sports Association and the Eretz Yisrael Olympic Committee.

Between 1938 and 1965, Alouf was the national supervisor of physical education schools in Israel.

In 1974, he received the Israel Prize.

Alouf died in 1980 and is known for coining number of Hebrew terms used in sport.

Awards
 Israel Prize (1974)

References

1900 births
1980 deaths
Israeli educators
20th-century Israeli writers
Israeli people of Belarusian-Jewish descent